Mohammad Fazel Bratyan (born 1980) is an Afghan football player. He has played for Afghanistan national team.

National team statistics

External links

1980 births
Living people
Afghan men's footballers
Association football midfielders
Afghanistan international footballers